Helcogramma nigra, the Rotuma triplefin, is a species of triplefin blenny in the genus Helcogramma. It was described by Jeffrey T.  Williams and Jeffrey C. Howe in 2003. This species occurs in the western central Pacific Ocean where it has been recorded from Papua New Guinea, the Solomon Islands, Vanuatu and Rotuma.

References

nigra
Fish described in 2003